Chevra Anshei Lubawitz of Borough Park is the oldest synagogue in Borough Park, located at 4024 12th Avenue in Borough Park, Brooklyn, New York.

Buildings 
Founded as Chevra Anshei Lubawitz Nusach Ha'ari of Borough Park in 1914. The building was erected by Congregation Beth El of Borough Park in 1906. On June 11, 1906, The Brooklyn Daily Eagle reported the cornerstone laying "Borough President Bird S. Coler was the principal speaker at the ceremonies attending the laying of the cornerstone of the Temple Beth El which is being erected at Twelfth avenue and Forty-first street, yesterday afternoon." In 1922 it was sold to Chevra Anshei Lubawitz of Borough Park.

Demolition proposal
In August 2017, following the purchase of the building and land by a property developer, a judge temporarily blocked its demolition after members argued the sale of the building was based on misrepresentations. In November 2017, a preliminary injunction was issued.

References

Synagogues in Brooklyn
Buildings and structures completed in 1906
1906 establishments in New York City